Arthur Gary Bishop (September 29, 1952 – June 10, 1988) was an American convicted sex offender and serial killer. In 1983, as a result of a routine police investigation, he confessed to the murders of five young boys between 1979 and 1983.

Early life
Arthur Gary Bishop was born in Hinckley, Utah, the eldest of six brothers. Bishop was raised as a devout Latter-day Saint (Mormon), and was an Eagle Scout and an honor student. When he was 19, Bishop served as a missionary in the Philippines.

Bishop was arrested for embezzlement in February 1978 and given a five-year suspended sentence, but he skipped his parole and fled to Salt Lake City, living under the alias "Roger Downs." In 1979, he was excommunicated from the LDS Church.

While in Salt Lake City, he joined the Big Brothers program, where he was a "big brother" to a 10-year-old boy for nearly a year. Bishop was forced out of the program, before his first murder, after directors discovered he was molesting other children.

Victims
Alonzo Daniels, age 4, October 14, 1979
Claude Kimley Peterson, age 11, November 8, 1980
Danny Davis, age 4, October 20, 1981
Troy Ward, age 6, June 22, 1983
Graeme Cunningham, age 13, July 14, 1983

Murders
Bishop killed his first victim, a four-year-old named Alonzo Daniels, on October 14, 1979. He lured the boy from the courtyard of his apartment complex to his own apartment with the promise of free candy. After attempting to sexually assault Daniels, Bishop took him to the bathroom, hit him on the head with a hammer, and drowned him in the bathtub. He fondled the boy's dead body and mutilated his genitals. He put Daniels into a box and carried him out, walking past the boy's mother, who was frantically calling her son's name. He then buried the body in Cedar Valley. Bishop relived the experience in the following months by buying and killing puppies, stating, "It was so stimulating. A puppy whines just like Alonzo did. I would get frustrated at the whining. I would hit them with hammers or drown them or strangle them."

On November 8, 1980, Bishop was introduced to 11-year-old Kim Petersen at a skating rink by a young boy, "John," who Bishop was molesting in exchange for money and expensive toys. Bishop told "John" he wanted photographs of Petersen, and "John" agreed to contact Petersen on the pretext of buying a pair of roller skates the boy was trying to sell. When they called Petersen, Bishop took the phone and asked him to meet them at a pool parlor. He asked Petersen if he wanted to go out to Cedar Valley and hunt rabbits. Peterson said yes, and after convincing him to take photos in the car, they got out and started walking. Bishop, walking behind Petersen, shot him in the back with a .38 caliber revolver. Petersen began crying and Bishop shot him twice more in the head. He molested the boy's corpse, mutilated him in a fit of anger, and buried him, close to the body of Alonzo Daniels. Bishop was routinely questioned, but was not considered a suspect in Petersen's disappearance. Witnesses described the man Petersen had talked with at the roller-skating rink the day before his disappearance as being white, aged 25–35, around 200 pounds, and with dark hair.

On October 20, 1981, Bishop lured 4-year-old Danny Davis from a supermarket to his home half a block away. After playing with toys at Bishop's house, Davis became bored and started to cry. Concerned about the noise, Bishop put his hand over the boy's nose and mouth and suffocated him. Some other boys were coming over to Bishop's house, so he put the body in a couple of garbage bags and placed it in the corner of the kitchen. The next morning, after breakfast, Bishop took the body to Cedar Valley. Davis is the only child that Bishop did not molest. Several shoppers recalled a smiling man standing near the child but could only give vague descriptions of his appearance. Police launched one of the biggest searches in Salt Lake County history: teams of searchers scoured neighborhoods, divers dredged ponds and lakes, shoppers at the supermarket where Davis vanished agreed to undergo hypnosis to dislodge greater details of the abductor, fliers were printed offering a $20,000 reward, and the FBI were contacted, but were unable to find any trace of the boy.

After murdering Danny Davis, Bishop vowed to never do it again. However, almost two years later, on June 22, 1983, Bishop abducted 6-year-old Troy Ward while he was waiting on the corner near his home for his mother to return from the store with ice cream and cake; it was his sixth birthday. Bishop, now using the alias Roger Downs, took Ward to his bungalow and asked if he wanted to play a game. Ward said yes, and Bishop handcuffed him, tied him between two pillars in his basement, and pulled his pants down. When Ward began to cry, Bishop hit him with a rubber mallet until he was silent. Bishop put Ward's body in a trash bag and tossed it into a stream in Big Cottonwood Canyon, thinking it would be easier than burying another body in the desert.

One month later, on July 14, 1983, 13-year-old Graeme Cunningham was set to go on a trip to California with a friend and his father: "John" and Roger Downs (Arthur Bishop). After Bishop picked up Cunningham, he tricked him into going back to his home to pick up some marijuana to sell for cash. Bishop asked if Cunningham would pose for some photos, to which he agreed, in exchange for a skateboard. Bishop was afraid Cunningham would tell, so he hit him in the head twice with a hammer. He took Cunningham to the bathroom, filled the tub, and drowned him. He disposed of the body the same way he did Ward's. Two days later, "John" and Bishop went to California.

Local police looked into their past reports and found that Bishop (Roger Downs) lived in the vicinity of four of the abductions and knew the fifth child's parents. Police brought him in for questioning on the pretext of his assisting officers with their inquiries into Graeme Cunningham's disappearance. Feeling the pressure of the interrogation, Bishop told detectives he wanted to show them something at his house. When they arrived, they found more than 300 photos of young boys, some placed in a white wedding album, and 125 pictures of naked boys cut out from magazines. Police were able to identify and interview 21 boys he photographed and molested, but Bishop said that their estimate was low and to "double or triple" that amount. Back at the station, police managed to obtain Downs's real name and eventually got him to confess to all five murders. The confession lasted less than an hour, after which Bishop led the police to Cedar Valley.

Trial and execution
Bishop was brought to trial on February 27, 1984. During his trial, Bishop claimed that an addiction to child pornography molded his violent sexual fantasies and eventually drove him to act them out. The trial lasted three weeks; on March 19, 1984, Bishop was found guilty of five counts of first degree murder, five counts of aggravated kidnapping, and one count of sexually abusing a minor, and sentenced to death. Upon receiving his sentence, Bishop apologized to his victims' families and requested to be executed by lethal injection.

After his conviction, he wrote a letter in which he explained the motivation for his crimes:

Bishop was executed by lethal injection at Utah State Prison in Point of the Mountain on June 10, 1988. He declined a last meal. Before his execution, he again expressed remorse for his crimes:

See also 
 List of people executed in Utah
 List of serial killers in the United States

References

External links
 Contemporary news article pertaining to the execution of Arthur Gary Bishop

1952 births
1979 murders in the United States
1988 deaths
20th-century executions by Utah
20th-century executions of American people
American Mormon missionaries in the Philippines
American murderers of children
American people convicted of child sexual abuse
American people convicted of kidnapping
Executed American serial killers
Executed people from Utah
Former Latter Day Saints
Incidents of violence against boys
Male serial killers
Necrophiles
People convicted of embezzlement
People convicted of murder by Utah
People executed by Utah by lethal injection
People excommunicated by the Church of Jesus Christ of Latter-day Saints
People from Millard County, Utah
Violence against men in North America